Anders Todal (18 March 1883 – 6 March 1956) was a Norwegian teacher, politician and farmer. He was born in Valsøyfjord. He served as mayor of Åsen from 1919 to 1922, and from 1925 to 1931. He was elected to the Storting from 1931 to 1933, representing the Liberal Party in Nord-Trøndelag. He chaired the organization Noregs Mållag from 1932 to 1936. He was appointed school director in Nidaros from 1933, until he was fired in 1942. In 1942 he was imprisoned and incarcerated in Vollan prison and the Falstad concentration camp.

References

1883 births
1956 deaths
People from Møre og Romsdal
Norwegian educators
Liberal Party (Norway) politicians
Mayors of places in Nord-Trøndelag
Members of the Storting
Vollan concentration camp survivors
Falstad concentration camp survivors